Peter Scharmach (born 31 May 1964 in Remscheid) is an auto racing driver who is of both German and New Zealand nationality, who lives in Christchurch.

Career
Scharmach started his career in the rally sport during the 80s.
During the 1990s Scharmach raced in a number of touring car racing series in Germany and New Zealand, such as the Deutsche Tourenwagen Challenge.

Between 2000 and 2005 he competed in selected races of series such as the Renault Eurocup, Porsche Supercup and SEAT Leon Supercopa Germany. In 2005, he raced at the season-ending round of the World Touring Car Championship at Macau for Engstler Motorsport.

He finished third in the New Zealand Mini Challenge in 2006-07 and has also raced in the German equivalent. He finished fourth at the 2007 24 Hours Nürburgring. He raced in the Peugeot THP Spider Cup in 2008, and in ADAC GT Masters in 2009.

Racing record

Complete Porsche Supercup results
(key) (Races in bold indicate pole position) (Races in italics indicate fastest lap)

References

External links
Peter Scharmach's Internet Blog 
Career statistics at Driver Database
Profile on Speedsport Magazine

1964 births
Living people
German racing drivers
New Zealand racing drivers
People from Remscheid
Sportspeople from Düsseldorf (region)
Racing drivers from North Rhine-Westphalia
World Touring Car Championship drivers
Porsche Supercup drivers
ADAC GT Masters drivers
Walter Lechner Racing drivers
Nürburgring 24 Hours drivers
Engstler Motorsport drivers
Porsche Carrera Cup Germany drivers